Serhiy Hubryniuk (born 2 January 1970) is a Ukrainian former wrestler who competed in the 1996 Summer Olympics.

References

External links
 

1970 births
Living people
Olympic wrestlers of Ukraine
Wrestlers at the 1996 Summer Olympics
Ukrainian male sport wrestlers